Ádám Szirtes (born Ádám Szvitek February 10, 1925 – July 27, 1989) was a Hungarian actor.

Selected filmography
 Treasured Earth (1948)
 Kiskrajcár (1953)
 The Sea Has Risen (1953)
 Merry-Go-Round (1956)
 I'll Go to the Minister (1962)
 Tales of a Long Journey (1963)
 Háry János (1965)
 Twenty Hours (1965)
 The Testament of Aga Koppanyi (1967)
 Stars of Eger (1968)
 Irány Mexikó! (1968)
 Nobody's Daughter (1976)

External links

1925 births
1989 deaths
Hungarian male film actors
Hungarian male television actors
20th-century Hungarian male actors